Kings (also known as king's cup, donut, circle of death or ring of fire) is a drinking game using playing cards. Players must drink and dispense drinks based on cards drawn. The cards have predetermined drink rules prior to the game's beginning.  Often groups establish house rules with their own game variations.

Equipment
A deck of playing cards
Alcoholic beverages (typically wine, beer, or mixed drinks) or non alcoholic beverages
A large cup which will be used as the King's Cup, or (in the "Ring of Fire" version of the game) an unopened beer can

Setup and common rules

In this game, a deck of cards is shuffled and dealt into a circle around either an empty cup or a full drink of choice. Each card value is assigned an action, which is then performed by the relevant players upon it being drawn. Players then take turns drawing cards and participating in the activity assigned by the card dealt.

This game is open-ended and all of the cards can signify any mini-game, the rules and the card assignments are normally confirmed at the beginning of the game. Depending on house rules, the game either ends when the last rule card has been pulled or the king's cup has been consumed. In variations where cards are placed on top of the king's cup, the game is over when the cards fall off, with the player responsible for knocking them off having to consume the king's cup.

Players also often make up and agree on a set of rules every time the game is played. Some common assignments for card values include:

Ring of Fire

In the "Ring of Fire" version of the game, a can of beer (or other alcoholic beverage) is placed in the center of the ring of cards. Players "discard" cards by sliding them under the beer tab. The player who pops the beer tab must drink the whole can. That signals the end of the round, and another can is placed in the middle to continue the game. 

If by drawing a card a player creates a gap in the circle of cards, they must finish their own drink.

Variations and other rules

Like most other drinking games, Kings has endless variations of rules, and individual drinking groups usually have their own set of card effects. There will be similar rules, but there will most likely always be some that some players have never encountered before. Some games specify that playing a certain card allows that player to make up a new rule which lasts for the remainder of the game.

A major variation in the US, UK, Ireland, Australia, New Zealand, South Africa or Canada is that the contents of the King's Cup are drunk by the player who breaks the circle of cards (known as the Ring of Fire in the UK).

A popular variation in Australia is the Smoko or Toilet Card replacing Give Two Take Two. In this version, a player needs to possess a Smoko Card to leave the table to smoke or to use the toilet. A player can have multiple copies of the card and they can be traded, typically under conditions such as; the recipient must refill drinks on demand, crawl for the rest of the game, talk in a funny voice, etc.

When drinking from bottles of beer, the discard can be placed on top of the beer with two corners of each card hanging off the edge. As this continues, it will begin to resemble a mushroom. Similar to the game Jenga, if the mushroom collapses, the person who last placed their card or was attempting to do so must drink the entire bottle. If all cards are successfully discarded without the mushroom collapsing, the last person to discard drinks the bottle, and others finish their drinks.

In Belgium the game is known as "Circle of Destruction" or "Hardcore Kings". In the beginning a pint is placed in the middle of the circle and everyone has to pour some of their drink in it, from now on this drink is referred to as "Witch's Brew".

See also

 List of drinking games

References

Drinking games
Drinking card games
Australian card games